FS La Massana is an Andorran football club based in the parish of La Massana. The club currently play in Segona Divisió.

Current squad

External links
 Official website

Football clubs in Andorra
2005 establishments in Andorra
Association football clubs established in 2005